is a Prefectural Natural Park in eastern Miyagi Prefecture, Japan. First designated for protection in 1979, the park spans the municipalities of Ishinomaki and Onagawa.

See also
 National Parks of Japan
 Minami Sanriku Kinkasan Quasi-National Park

References

External links
  Maps of Kenjōsan Mangokuura Prefectural Natural Park (14 & 19)

Parks and gardens in Miyagi Prefecture
Protected areas established in 1979
1979 establishments in Japan
Ishinomaki
Onagawa, Miyagi